Kunoichi (クノイチ; stylized as 女 KUNOICHI in Japan) is a women's obstacle course competition held in Japan and broadcast on the Tokyo Broadcasting System. It is a spin-off of Sasuke, another obstacle course series. Kunoichi is different from Sasuke in that the competitors are exclusively female. The show is re-broadcast as Women of Ninja Warrior on the American G4 channel. It originally ran for 8 tournaments between 2001 and 2009 with the first tournament held as Kinniku Banzuke special.  In 2017, after an 8-year hiatus, it was renewed for a 9th tournament which aired on February 12, 2017.  The 9th, 10th, and 11th tournaments took place on an indoor course at the Makuhari Messe Convention Hall, unlike past tournaments taking place at Mt. Midoriyama Studio City.

Participants
Participants compete for a prize of 2 million yen ($25,497 U.S. dollars).

Each competition starts with 100 competitors from a range of backgrounds such as actors, comedians, housewives, and athletes, amateur and Olympians alike. The competitors are mainly Japanese, but many international competitors have participated.

Kunoichi All-Stars
 - This three-time consecutive Kunoichi champion has earned her the nickname "Queen of Kunoichi". Weighing only , Ayako is also an acrobatic dancer, who used to work for Muscle Musical. She achieved total victory in the 4th, 5th, and 6th competitions. In the 7th Competition however, she fell on the last obstacle of the Second Stage, the last part of the Swinging Beams, which was a metal beam without a rope support like the last two. Her failure left the other competitors in visible shock because, in the words of the narrator "She was the competitor everyone was counting on!" As of 2008, she has cleared the first stage four times in a row and the second, third and final stages three times in a row. Recently Ayako and a few other Muscle Musical members including the creator and Sayaka Asami broke away and created their own group, so it is now rumored that she will no longer compete. (This seems to be confirmed as she did not compete in Kunoichi 8.)

 - This is one of the top competitors on Kunoichi and is notable for advancing all the way to the Third Stage in her first tournament, and failing Domino Hill(4th Competition). In the 5th Competition, she looked better than Miss Perfect herself, however by the time she reached the Skyway Pole in the final stage she looked defeated and her time ran out. She is a Japanese newscaster and went into modeling after her appearance on Kunoichi, before joining the Muscle Musical by the time of the 7th competition. Her run in the 6th competition was cut from the broadcast, but it is known that she failed stage 1. She was one of only four competitors who defeated the First Stage in the 7th competition, but she failed on the Monkey Bars in the Second Stage. As of 2008 she has cleared the first stage three times, the second stage twice, and the third stage once. Rie Komiya also competed in SASUKE 22, SASUKE 23, SASUKE 24 and SASUKE 26, being disqualified on the Jumping Spider and then failing the Half-pipe Attack, the Log Grip and the Rolling Escargot respectively. In Kunoichi 8 she became the second woman ever to beat the Final Stage.

 - After almost completing the Final Stage in the 2nd and 3rd Competitions, she was thought to be the most likely competitor to complete the Final Stage, and was once thought to be the "Queen of Kunoichi". In the 3rd Competition, Yuko missed the button by 0.2 seconds. That was later similar to Makoto Nagano in Sasuke 12 (he reached the top of Final Stage's tower and missed the red button by 0.11 seconds). Since then, she has only made it to the Third Stage once (in the 5th competition), and hasn't passed the First Stage in the 4th, 6th and 7th competition. Besides being a Kunoichi competitor, she is also a celebrity athlete, and a regular Sasuke competitor. Fans also call her Ms. Kunoichi, for her similar status to Mr. Sasuke, Katsumi Yamada. As of 2008 she has cleared the first stage three times, the second stage three times and the third stage twice. She is also known as the Katsumi Yamada of Kunoichi.

 - She is a professional snowboarder/wakeboarder. Maho was considered an All-Star of Kunoichi by the second time she has competed. She is known for her impressive speed nearly matching Ayako Miyake's records. Also she made it to the Final Stage during her second appearance, in the 6th tournament, where she completed the Third Stage most difficult obstacle, Domino Hill, at a very quick pace, that exceed any competitors' time who attempted or completed that obstacle (including Ayako Miyake). As she made it past the first three stages, it seems that she wasn't nervous about any obstacles standing in her way, but by the time she reached the Final Stage, she was unsure about her footing, constantly looking down, and began to lose speed on the Brick Climb, which by the time she completed time was already up. In the 7th tournament, she was the only competitor to reach the Third Stage, however she was defeated by the obstacle that she had defeated in the previous tournament, Domino Hill. In Kunoichi 8 she was eliminated when she wasn't one of the top two in her group to finish the first stage. As of 2010 she has cleared the first stage twice, the second stage twice and the third stage once.

Regulars
Kunoichi has several competitors who competing on a regular basis. Some of these include:

 - A mother-daughter team. Though the mother, Yuko, has yet to complete the First Stage, Rena is the second 13-year-old to complete the First Stage (the first was Saki Suzuki in the 3rd competition), but she is the youngest to complete the Second Stage. Rena has also competed in the juniors division of Sasuke where she ran out of time just a few inches from the buzzer of the Final Stage. Yuko is a housewife, and her daughter is a tomboy and an athletic student, who joined the track and field team in order to train for Kunoichi. Rena also competed in Kunoichi 8, but she failed 1st Stage's Swinging Jump.

 - Was the women's group leader in the related series, Muscle Musical. Before the Muscle Musical, she was part of the dance team DIG. Recently she broke away from Muscle Musical and formed her own group with Ayako Miyake. She competed from Kunoichi 3-5 and made it to the Third Stage all 3 times, but unfortunately failed Domino Hill all three times in exactly the same spot, in the same way. Asami's performances have earned herself a spot as one of the best competitors to date, but she will probably never compete again.

 - is a Jazz Dance Instructor hailing from Tokyo. She first appeared in the 3rd competition and wowed everyone by making it all the way to the Final Stage. Izumi managed a great run but ran out of time just a few feet short of the buzzer. In the following tournament, Izumi was the only finalist from the previous tournament to clear Stage 1, however in Stage 2 she failed the Triple Hurdle (a common casualty in Kunoichi 1 and 2). Since competing in Kunoichi, Izumi has married and her married name is Mika Watanabe. She also participated in SASUKE 12 and SASUKE 13, failing Stage 1's Jump Hang and Prism Tilt respectively. She returned after SASUKE was renamed SASUKE RISING. In SASUKE 28, she failed the Rolling Escargot. In SASUKE 29, like SASUKE 12, the redesigned Jump Hang (Jump Hang Kai) was her downfall.

 - A professional sumo wrestler who, due to her large and overweight body, fails on the first obstacle in the First Stage every time. Since the start of Kunoichi, she has participated in all but the 5th Competition.

International participants
Kunoichi has a more diverse competition than Sasuke; in the 6th competition, over 20 different nations were represented.

A few foreign competitors include:

Kyra Gracie - A member of the Gracie Brazilian jiu-jitsu Family. She competed in the 6th Competition, but failed the First Stage's Balance Bridge.

Catalina Ponor - A Romanian Olympic gold medal gymnast, she competed in the 6th competition, where she failed the "Flying Pillar" in the First Stage.

Mirabella Akhunu - A Ukrainian gymnast who competed in the 2004 Athens Olympics. She made it to the Second Stage in the 5th competition, but failed on the Spinning Log.

Oana Ban - Romanian gymnastic gold medalist in the team competition at the 2004 Athens Olympics. She made it to the Second Stage in the 4th Competition, but failed on the Floating Bridge.

Tasha Schwikert - American gymnast, 2000 Olympian, Finished one second after her time ran out in the Second Stage of the 3rd Competition.

Diana Pickler - this American heptahlete from Washington State University competed in the 7th competition, but failed on the First Stage's Log Jam.

Sara Jean Underwood - the American model, 'Playboy Playmate of the Year 2007' and host of Attack of the Show competed in the 8th competition and made it to the Second Stage but she failed the Dancing Stones.

Other notable participants
At least four Sasuke all-stars - Shingo Yamamoto, Toshihiro Takeda, Katsumi Yamada, and Makoto Nagano - are known to be training Kunoichi competitors. Each of them competed in the 7th competition, with their mentors (except for Yamamoto) present.

Yamamoto's trainee, Sayaka Okamoto who is an employee at his service station, advanced to the Second Stage of the 6th Competition (where Yamamoto was present) at just 16 years of age. However, her run is ended on the Second Stage, as she falling on the new Swinging Beams. In the 7th Competition, Okamoto failed on the First Stage's Log Jam. In the 8th Competition, she clear the First Stage yet again, but failed the Second Stage's Swinging Beams again. Like Yamamoto, Okamoto competed in her maroon Mobil 1 uniform shirt.
Takeda's trainee, firefighter Keiko Oshima, who fights fires alongside Takeda, failed the newly redesigned Hop Rocket in the 7th Competition's First Stage. Oshima would invited back in the 8th Competition, but failed to catch up the flag with Natsumi Hayashi and Ayako Kawahara (the latter being a member of Muscle Musical), by resulting she was eliminated.
Nagano's trainee, fitness instructor Kaori Anraku, failed the Flying Pillar in the 7th Competition's First Stage.
Yamada's trainee, walking instructor Nobuko Onoda, also went out on the newly redesigned Hop Rocket in the 7th Competition. It was said that they met through Onoda's father, who is a medical expert that Yamada once consulted about a shoulder injury.
Nagano's wife, Asami Nagano competed in the 8th competition and actually timed out on the Net-Wall Climb but she won the Turntable-Balance Beam Challenge. In Stage 2, she failed the Barrel Roll.

Nagano has also trained his older sister, Taeko Uchida, who has yet to complete the First Stage.

Notable other competitors include:

 Asami Abe, J-Pop singer (7)
 Fumie Nakajima, Member of the 'Shape UP Girls' fitness group (5, 7)
 Ikue Teshigawara, Short track speed skater from the Olympics (6, 8)
 Makoto Ogawa, Former member of Morning Musume (8)
 Sora Aoi, Actress (6-7)
 Kayo Haga, Former Tokyo Disneyland dancer and member of Muscle Musical (3-7)
 Airi Yoshihama, Former member of G-Rockets (2-3)
 Nao Oikawa, Actress (5)
 Narumi Kitagawa, Surfer (5-8)
 Masami Yusa, Beach Flag Lifesaver (1-5)
 Mikie Hara, Actress (8)
 Saori Yoshida, Freestyle wresting from the Olympics (4)
 Kana Watanabe, Judoka (9-10)
 Chie Nishimura, Stunt performer and homemaker (3-8)
 Ayaka Sakai, Samurai Rock Orchestra member and performer (9-11)
 Ayako Inada, Rhythmic Gymnastics from the Olympics and member of Muscle Musical (5-6, 8)
 Momoe Nakanishi, Professional wrestler (3)
 Nao Watanabe, Lacrosse player (3)
 Tomomi Hanzawa, Member of G-Rockets (3-4)
 Nami Ichinohe, Actress and member of Muscle Musical (3-4, 7)
 Reika Saiki, Professional wrestler (9-11)
 Miho Yamada, Rhythmic Gymnastics from the Olympics (1-2, 4)
 Kazue Watanabe, Track and field star (2-4)
 Hitomi Sakai, Idoling!!! member and TV personality (8)
 Tomomi Arimatsu, Member of Muscle Musical (8)
 Yoko Mori, Former member of C.C. Girls (1-3, 6-7)
 Sachiyo Yamada, Lacrosse player (8)
 Yuka Kato, SONY Bravia Ladies Field Hockey (8)
 Aya Asahina, Actress (9-11)
 Erika Yazawa, Idoling!!! member and TV personality (8)

Stages

Kunoichi is composed of four stages, with the exception of the 1st, 2nd and 9th Competitions which consisted of only three stages each. Competitors must complete a stage in order to continue to the next stage. In the 9th competitions, the First and Second Stage were renamed to the RED and BLUE Stage respectively. Then, in the 10th competitions, the new Third Stage was renamed the BLACK Stage thus returned to a 4-stage format.

First Stage

Second Chance Round

Second stage

Third stage
(There was no 3rd stage in Kunoichi 1, 2 and 9)

Final Stage

(No one made it to the Final Stage in 7 & 10, so the Time Limit is unknown).

Obstacles

First stage
Participants are given 80 to 105 seconds to complete First Stage.

In the 1st Competition, the First Stage proved to be a difficult course, as only two people were able to move on to the next stage. This caused a major change in the First Stage, making it less difficult than in the 1st Competition.

Dancing Stones 
9 vertical poles, each topped with a rounded pad, are arranged in an offset pattern.  The competitor must step from pole to pole, balancing on the rounded mound, to cross the obstacle.  From the 4th Competition onward, the mound on a central pole near the beginning of the obstacle is on a spring, making it somewhat more unstable than the others.  Along with the "Hop Rocket", the "Dancing Stones" are responsible for most contestant eliminations. In the 7th and 8th Competitions, the "Dancing Stones" are a Second Stage obstacle.

Stepping Stones
A set of five small floating pads in a pool of water that alternate sides. The contestant must hop across these five bullet-shaped pads to the other side. This has a similarity to Sasuke "Sextuple Step".

Windmill Cross
A sloped carousel spins slowly.  Three narrow fins radiate from the center, providing a narrow place to safely walk.  The contestant must walk across a fin to reach the center of the carousel, and across another fin to reach the opposite side before jumping to safety.  Contestants who fall off the fin onto the carousel rarely can avoid sliding down the sloped sides and into the water below. In the 1st Competition, the obstacle was composed of three small windmills rather than the one big windmill used in later competitions.

Log Jam
Two stationery round "logs" are placed above a pool of water. The logs are separated forcing the contestant to maintain balance while walking across the logs, but also while jumping to the second log. The second log is about three quarters the size of the first, and is also placed lower and to the right. In the 7th competition, the buzzer that starts the "Flying Pillar" was placed at the start of the Log Jam. The buzzer, when hit, sounded a horn and started the "Flying Pillar"'s downward journey, forcing contestants to move quickly while maintaining balance.

Balance Bridge 
A long, flat plank stretches between two risers. The plank can rotate along its long axis. In the 3rd Competition, a fin-like protrusion running along part of the long axis was in center of the Balance Bridge making it similar to the version in Sasuke in the first 7 competitions. In the 4th Competition and onward, 3 large rectangular holes are cut along the long axis. Each of these served to make running straight down the middle difficult. This obstacle was also on Sasuke for eight competitions (1st-7th and 11th).

Cylinder Walk / Barrel Roll
Contestants must balance on the side of a steel barrel as it rolls down a slow incline, similar to the "Balance Tank" on Sasuke.

Tornado Run
Contestants must cross a set of three balance beams, each only 7 inches wide, while a wind machine blows at  against them in an attempt to throw them off balance. The first beam is positioned directly against the wind machine, thus creating a headwind; the second beam is at a 45-degree angle against the fan, and the third beam runs alongside the wind machine, resulting in a crosswind.

Gateway Bridge
Contestants must use balance to tiptoe their away along a bridge, about 5cm wide and 60cm long, and then turn 90 degrees and tiptoe along a second bridge.

Angle Run 
The contestant runs along a riser tilted at a 45-degree angle. At the end of the obstacle, the contestant must jump across the water to a small cushion to continue the course. Starting in the 5th Competition, the contestant would run across one angled riser, then jump to and run across a second angled riser facing the other direction before reaching the end of the obstacle.

Hop Rocket 
Assisted by the bounce from a mini-trampoline, contestants try to jump across a large gap and land on a padded riser on the opposite side. In the 3rd competition, it had a small yellow post located in between the trampoline and the other side.

Yellow-Posted Hop Rocket
The competitor must bounce form a mini-trampoline, to a large yellow post in the center of the water. The competitor must then pull herself up and jump to a floating pad and then proceed to the next obstacle.

Vertical Limit/Conviction Hill
The Vertical Limit is a combination between the "Hill Climb" and the "Warped Wall" where the contestants must climb a hill with two ropes available. In the 5th competition, it was remade into the Conviction Hill where the contestants ran up two ramps decreasing in height, that is similar to the "Crooked Wall" on Sasuke.

Slippery Slide 
Contestants ride a zip-line over a pit of water. Before reaching the end, the contestant must let go of the zip-line and drop to a small cushioned island in the water below. The contestant then crosses a series of narrow balance beams to reach the "Escape Ladder".

Escape Ladder 
The contestant climbs a rope ladder (or a metal ladder, as used in the 1st competition) to reach the upper platform and hit the buzzer to complete the stage.

Escape Pole
The contestant most climb up a pole to reach to upper platform and hit the buzzer to complete the stage. Very similar to the "Skyway Pole".

Float Run
The contestant must run across five foam floats, two large squares and three narrower rectangles.

Prism Tilt
The contestant must run across a prism-shaped object that is on an axle. Used for only one time on Sasuke.

Flying Pillar
The contestant must hit a buzzer to start a soft yellow pillar's downward journey, then use a springboard to catch and hang from the pillar, then hold her feet up avoiding a pool of water to land on a floating platform.
In the seventh tournament, the buzzer that started the Flying Pillar's movement was placed before the preceding obstacle, the "Log Jam", forcing the contestant to get across the "Log Jam" quickly enough to be able to catch the pillar.

Double Hurdle
Used only once, this obstacle consists of a pair of hurdles, the second of which is about double the size of the first.

Falling Pole
The contestant must slide down an inclined pole over the water to a floating platform, then follow a balance beam to the "Escape Ladder".

Floating Hurdle
The contestants must leap a hurdle that is attached to a floating raft positioned in the water. There are two hurdles, that are positioned side by side.

Log Bridge
The contestants must cross a stationary round log. There are three logs positioned side by side; so the last of the four contestants to reach the obstacle must wait for the other competitors to finish it.

Swinging/Hanging Logs
The contestants must cross a series of three swinging logs that are suspended in the air on chains.

Spider Cage/Iron Prison
The contestants must cross a pool of water on an obstacle similar to Sasuke's Spider Walk, but the frame is made of metal wires instead of glass panels. There are four columns, one for each contender.

Swing Jump
The contestants must use a playground-style swing to reach a raft that is positioned in the water below. There are four swings and rafts; one for each contender.

Raft Transfer/Raft Pull
The contestants must use a rope to propel themselves (and their raft) to the next obstacle.

Net-Wall Climb
The contestants must climb a large net, identical to the final obstacle on the current Sasuke course.

Second stage
In the first five competitions, a competitor only had from 30 to 50 seconds to complete the entire course.

In the 6th Competition, it was turned into a time trial, with only the six fastest competitors (assuming more than six complete the course successfully) advancing to the Third Stage.  In addition, the 6th Competition's Second Stage carried a 70-second time limit. By the 7th Competition, the course used the original rules, which the competitors must complete the Stage under a certain time limit. The 8th Competition permitted a maximum of 12 competitors to advance (basing it on fastest time if more than 12 completed the course), and there was a time limit of 210 seconds to complete the course.

Super Jump
Contestants stand on a mattress-like platform that slides down a slope that ends in a ramp. Before the platform hits the end of the ramp, the contestants must jump off it in order to land on the small cushion. For the 8th competition, wheels have been added to the underside of the platform.

Spinning Slopes
There are two sloped round platforms that rotate. The contestants have to jump from one to another to get to the next obstacle.

Spinning Log
The contestant must cross a spinning log in order to reach the other side. Also used on Sasuke for the first two competitions, before returning in the 17th competition as the Log Slope.

Ledge Walk
The competitor must cross two sections of ledge at the bottom of a wall, with water below.  The second section has two short strips sticking out of the wall at about knee height to increase the difficulty. This obstacle once was on Sasuke.

Floating Bridge
The competitor must cross several floating logs that gradually sink when stepped on.

Triple Hurdle
The competitor must clear three hurdles of varying height. In the 4th Competition, the hurdles are positioned over water, with trampolines between them to reach the next hurdle.

Swinging Hammers
The competitors must cross a bridge while avoiding four swinging hammers.  This obstacle is similar to Sasuke's "Hammer Dodge".

Two-Pole Bridge
The contestant must balance a foot on each of two parallel metal poles and traverse them to the next obstacle.

Net Climb
The contestant must climb a cargo net. The netting design is similar to SASUKEs "Jump Hang", The function is similar to SASUKE's "Net Bridge". This was one of the two final stage obstacles in the 7th competition, but was much larger.

Swinging Beams
The contestant must cross two beams that are suspended by rope, with ropes hanging above the middle of each beam to assist in crossing.  The first beam is made of a wood.  The second beam is made of bamboo.  The contestant must then cross a third beam made of metal that is supported by metal poles and lacks the middle assist rope.

Hill Climb
The competitors must scamper up a 60°,  hill. Also used on Sasuke in the first four competitions.

Climbing Bars/Monkey Bars
A set of monkey bars must be crossed by the competitors. The monkey bars are set on a pivoting mount on the scaffolding above. This is later used on Sasuke as the "Swing Ladder".

The 8th Competition Obstacles
In the 8th competition, the course involves several obstacles from other stages: the Dancing Stones and Cylinder Walk from Stage 1, and a section of Domino Hill from Stage 3.

 Third Stage 
A third stage was placed before the Final Stage beginning in the 3rd Competition.  Like the previous stages, the Third Stage is composed of balance-based obstacles.  In the 3rd-4th Competition, each competitor was given 90 seconds to complete the course.  For the 5th Competition, the time limit to complete the first two obstacles was eliminated.  The contestant starts the timer during the final obstacle.  This timer was removed in the 6th Competition to make it similar to the men's third stage.

Super Vault 
The competitor pole vaults over two bodies of water. The second landing area has an upward incline, making it harder for competitors to land on it without falling into the water behind them. Removed in 5th Competition.  This obstacle was also on Sasuke except that there was only 1 platform instead of 2.

Domino Hill
The competitor balances and walks across 40 upright, foam dominoes.  If a competitor loses her balance and touches a domino with her hand, she is disqualified. In the 7th tournament, it appears that the red zone of dominoes has been changed to something that looks like the "Dancing Stones". In the 8th tournament, a shortened version of Domino Hill was used in Stage 2. Based on both Kinniku Banzuke's "Sponge Bridge" event (although there is no blue zone), and the Takeshi's Castle game 'Dominoes'.

Pendulum Bridge
It was removed in the 5th Competition, but reinstated in the following one. This was in the 1st and 2nd Competitions in the Second Stage as the "Swinging Beam".

Unforgiving Wall
It is a combination of the Cliff Hanger and Ledge Walk. The women are given a footholes in addition to 4 handholes.  The wall is tilted backward about 10 degrees every gap, meaning the women must cross it leaning backward.  There are four sections, with the second and third each rising , and the fourth going down . Replaces the "Super Vault" in the 5th Competition.

Dreamers Road
"Dreamers Road" is a long balance beam over a chasm of water.  Before the competitor begins crossing, she must hit a button to begin the 15-second timer.  To complete the stage, she must cross the balance beam and hit the final buzzer at the end before the 15-second timer runs out. Replaces the "Pendulum Bridge" in the 5th Competition. It is similar to the original Final Stage, the "Balance Walk", but smaller, and no cylindrical bumps.

Peg Jump
Added for the 6th Competition and replacing the "Unforgiving Wall", the competitor must jump across to five small platforms of differing heights. Similar to Sasuke's Pillar Path but is spread apart.

Magic Wall
A wall that must be scaled using rock-climbing equipment. To increase the difficulty the second third is leaning backward. Replaces the "Pendulum Bridge" in the 6th Competition.

High Jump
Contestants attempt a classic athletics High Jump, with the three contestants achieving the highest heights advancing to the final stage.

Final Stage
In the first two competitions, there were only three stages.  The Final Stage became the fourth stage beginning with the 3rd Competition.

Nobody made the Final Stage in the 1st Competition. The Final Stage in the 2nd Competition involved a long balance beam with cylindrical bumps, over a pool of water. The competitor was supported by a harness. There was no time limit.

The Final Stage was revamped for the 3rd Competition, making it similar to the Final Stage of Sasuke.  The competitor has 30, 35, 40 or 60 seconds to complete two obstacles. In the 3rd and 4th Competitions, it was to climb up a  tower using ladder rungs attached to the sides of the walls, then climb a  pole to a landing and the finishing button.  In the 5th Competition, the ladder rungs alternated, making it more difficult for the competitor to reach the end, since they would have to climb the opposite wall every few steps. For the 6th Competition, the tower was replaced by a  Climbing Wall.In the 7th Competition, the wall tower was replaced with a  Net Climb.In the 8th Competition competitors must complete Survival Climb (consisting of a series of metal bars), before climbing two vertically aligned (and opposite) Climbing Walls (3m+3m) to reach the goal.
Unlike Sasuke, Kunoichi's Final Stage competitors are not dropped into a free fall if they fail to finish before time runs out.  However, they are still supported by a safety line.  The ladders and  net slide out of the way when the competitor transitions to the "Pole Climb", but are not timed like Sasuke's "Spider Climb". To date; only 9 competitors have ever attempted the final stage and only Ayako Miyake, Yuko Mizuno and Rie Komiya have attempted the final stage more than once.

United States and United Kingdom broadcasts
The program can be seen in the United States as Women of Ninja Warrior'' on G4 and Esquire Network. Just like in the regular version, the play-by-play commentary and interviews with participants are subtitled in English while the introduction, player profiles, and replays have been dubbed by voice actor Dave Wittenberg. Each episode is a 30-minute portion of the Japanese broadcast. To date, the first eight competitions have aired in America. As with its sister program, Ninja Warrior, in G4's relaunch, the first seven episodes are edited with the opening sequence slightly edited with a widescreen version from the eighth episode then cuts to the show's logo, as transitions are replaced with a simple transition featuring the show's logo.

It is also broadcast in the UK on the channel Challenge. The first seven competitions were dubbed by Stuart Hall, while Kunoichi 8 was dubbed by Jim North. Kunoichi has now removed Hall's commentary and re-dubbed the first seven competitions with new commentary by Jim North.

Episodes also feature segments such as "Ninja Killer" (an obstacle from a stage that took out the most contestants), and "Warrior Wipeout" (the best wipeout from a Women of Ninja Warrior contestant). As of 2019, the first 8 competitions have been aired in the USA and UK.

Results
The following is a list of people who advanced the farthest and reached at least the third stage in each competition. Under each competition, the results are listed in order of who went the farthest first.

 1st Competition 
Aired: December 22, 2001NOTE: Nobody cleared the second stage in this competition.

 2nd Competition 
Aired: December 21, 2002

 3rd Competition 
Aired: September 24, 2003NOTE: In Stage 1 Kazue Watanabe went after Nao Watanabe, indicating she was the 97th competitor to go.

 4th Competition 
Aired: December 25, 2004

 5th Competition 
Aired: January 7, 2006

 6th Competition 
Aired: September 20, 2006

Tanaka completed the wall climb but her time ran out as she began the skyway pole.NOTE''': Numbers were not given out in this tournament but the producers had the order in which the competitors went. Only Miyake's and Tanaka's numbers were revealed because they made it to the Final Stage.

7th Competition 
Aired: September 5, 2007

8th Competition 
Aired: October 7, 2009

^Arimatsu cleared the final stage with 5.9 seconds on the clock but she grabbed the edge of the 2nd wall on the Climbing Board

9th Competition 
Aired: February 12, 2017

10th Competition 
Aired: July 2, 2017

11st Competition 
Aired: July 1, 2018

External links 
 TBS Kunoichi 2007 Page                                                     
 TBS Kunoichi Main Page 
 TBS Kunoichi 2006 Page 
 

G4 (American TV network) original programming
Japanese game shows
Sasuke (TV series)
2001 Japanese television series debuts
2009 Japanese television series endings
Ninja Warrior (franchise)
TBS Television (Japan) original programming
Television spin-offs